The Democratic Party of Georgia is the affiliate of the Democratic Party in the U.S. state of Georgia. It is one of the two major political parties in the state and is chaired by Nikema Williams.

President Jimmy Carter was a Georgia Democrat. Since the passage of the Affordable Care Act, Georgia Democrats have advocated Medicaid expansion in the state, a policy that would provide a federally subsidized health insurance plan to approximately 500,000 Georgians. At $5.15 an hour, Georgia is one of only two states with a state minimum wage below the federal minimum wage; a priority for Georgia Democrats in the 2010s and 2020s has been increasing the minimum wage.

History

For over a century, the Democratic Party dominated Georgia state and local politics with a membership largely consisting of conservative Southern Democrats. From 1872 to 2002, the Democratic Party controlled the governorship, both houses of the state legislature, and most statewide offices.

In 1976, former Democratic governor Jimmy Carter (1971−1975) was elected the 39th president of the United States.

After switching to the Republican Party in 1998, Sonny Perdue went on to defeat Democrat Roy Barnes in the 2002 gubernatorial election. In 2004, the Democratic Party lost control of the Georgia House of Representatives, putting the party in the minority for the first time in state history.

The Democratic Party of Georgia entered the 2010 elections with hopes that former governor Roy Barnes could win back the governorship. Polls showed a tight race between Barnes and Republican gubernatorial nominee Nathan Deal, with some predicting a runoff election. However, on election day, Republicans won every statewide office.

Since the passage of the Affordable Care Act, Georgia Democrats have advocated Medicaid expansion in the state, a policy that would provide a federally subsidized healthcare plan to about 500,000 Georgians. At $5.15 an hour, Georgia is one of only two states with a state minimum wage below the federal minimum wage; a priority for Georgia Democrats in the 2010s and 2020s has been increasing the minimum wage.

Since 2016, Georgia Democrats have begun to see better results, with them getting very close to winning the governorship in 2018. In 2020, Joe Biden narrowly won the state, the first time for a Democratic presidential candidate since 1992. Not long after that, Democrats Jon Ossoff and Raphael Warnock won both of the state's U.S. Senate seats in runoff elections in 2021, the first time Democrats won statewide office since 2006.

Leadership
Officers of the Democratic Party of Georgia are elected by the state Democratic committee at a January meeting following each regular gubernatorial election. Officers serve four-year terms, and there is no limit on the number of terms an individual can serve as an officer. Below are the current officers:

Chair: Nikema Williams
First Vice Chair: Ted Terry
Vice Chair of Candidate Recruitment: Adrienne White
Vice Chair of Congressional District Chairs and County Party Liaison: Sarah Todd
Vice Chair of Constituency Groups: Bee Nguyen
Secretary: Justin Holsomback
Treasurer: Jason Esteves
House Leader: James Beverly
Senate Leader: Gloria Butler

Caucuses and affiliates
 AAPI Caucus
 African American Caucus
 Democratic Women's Council
 Disability Caucus
 Georgia Democratic Rural Council
 Georgia Federation of Democratic Women
 Georgia House Democrats
 Georgia Senate Democrats
 Greening Georgia
 Latino Caucus
 LGBTQ Caucus
 Senior Caucus
 Veterans Caucus
 Young Democrats of Georgia

Current elected officials

Members of Congress
Democrats hold five of Georgia's 14 seats in the U.S. House of Representatives and both of Georgia's seats in the U.S. Senate.

U.S. Senate
Democrats have controlled both of Georgia's seats in the U.S. Senate since 2021:

U.S. House of Representatives

Statewide offices
The party controls none of the thirteen statewide constitutional offices such as Governor, Lieutenant Governor, Secretary of State, State Superintendent of Schools, Commissioner of Agriculture, Commissioner of Insurance, Commissioner of Labor, or state Attorney General, etc.

State Legislature
Democrats control 22 of the 56 State Senate seats and 77 of the 180 State House seats. Two-year terms of office apply to both chambers, and the entire membership of each body is elected at the same time in even-numbered years.

Senate
Current senators
Senate Minority Leader: Gloria Butler (SD55)
Senate Deputy Minority Leader: Harold V. Jones II (SD22)
Senate Minority Caucus Chair: Elena Parent (SD42)
 House
Current representatives
House Minority Leader: James Beverly (HD143)
House Minority Whip: David Wilkerson (HD38)
House Minority Caucus Chair: Billy Mitchell (HD88)

Presidential elections
Since 1948, Democrats have won Georgia's presidential electoral votes 9 times, while Republicans have won Georgia 10 times. However, in the last 10 presidential elections, Democrats have won Georgia only twice, in 1992 and 2020.

List of chairs

Elected by the state convention
 Thomas Hardeman (1872)
 L. N. Trammell (1880)
 Charles F. Clay (1883)
 B. H. Bigham (1886)
 Hoke Smith (1888)
 William Yates Atkinson (1890–1892)
 Allen Fort (1892-1894) 
 Alexander Stephens Clay (1894–1898)
 Fleming W. Dubignon (1898–1900)
 E. T. Brown (1902–1904)
 E. J. Yeomans (1904–1906)
 Alexander Lawton Miller (1906–1908)
 Hewlett A. Hall (1908–1909)
 Charles R. Pendleton (1909–1910)
 W. C. Wright (1910–1912)
 William J. Harris (1912–1913)
 William S. West (1913–1914)
 E. J. Reagan (1914–1916)
 John James Flynt Sr. (1916–1920)
 William Jerome Vereen (1920–1921)
 G. E. Maddox (1925–30)
 Lawrence S. Camp (1930–32)
 Hugh Howell (1935–1937)
 Charles S. Reid (1937)
 Jim L. Gillis (1939)
 William Y. Atkinson Jr. (1942)
 J. Lon Duckworth (1943–1946)
 James S. Peters (1948–1954)
 John Sammons Bell (1954–1960)
 J. B. Fuqua (1962–1966)
 James H. Gray Sr. (1966–1970)

Appointed by the governor
 David Gambrell (1970–1972)
 Charles Kirbo (1972–1974)
 Marge Thurman (1974–1982)
 Al Holloway (1982)
 Bert Lance (1982–1986)
 John Henry Anderson (1986–1990) 
 Ed Sims (1990–1994)
 John Blackmon (1994–1998)
 David Worley (1998–2001)
 Calvin Smyre (2001–2004)

Elected by the state committee
 Bobby Kahn (2004–2007)
 Jane Kidd (2007–2010)
 Mike Berlon (2011–2013)
 Nikema Williams (2013)
 DuBose Porter (2013–2019)
 Nikema Williams (2019–present)

See also
Political party strength in Georgia (U.S. state)

References

External links
 Democratic Party of Georgia
 Young Democrats of Georgia
 

 
Georgia
Democratic Party